Leonard "Len" Shapiro (born February 2, 1947, in Brooklyn, New York) is an American sportswriter for The Washington Post.

Career
Shapiro joined the Post in 1969, starting as a copy editor. The following year he was hired to report high school sports, before moving to covering the Washington Redskins in 1973. From 1973 until 1978, he was the Redskins' beat reporter for the Post. In 1979 he became an assistant sports editor for the paper, and was subsequently promoted to deputy sports editor and then to sports editor in 1987.

In 2001, he received the Dick McCann Memorial Award from the Pro Football Hall of Fame.

Personal life
Shapiro is married to Vicky Moon, an editor and writer; they have three children, Jennifer, Emily, and Taylor.

References

Living people
1947 births
American sportswriters
The Washington Post journalists